Mrs. Santa Claus is a 1996 American made-for-television musical fantasy comedy film directed by Terry Hughes, with a score by Jerry Herman, starring Angela Lansbury in the title role.

First broadcast as a Hallmark Entertainment presentation on CBS on December 8, 1996, the film was billed as the first original musical written for television since Rodgers and Hammerstein's Cinderella in 1957.

Plot
Anna Claus has Santa's workshop running so efficiently in December 1910, the team has completed all the toys and presents a week ahead of schedule ("Seven Days 'Til Christmas"). Mrs. Claus attempts to offer her husband Nicholas a new, more efficient, route around the world, but he is preoccupied by the deluge of mail as Christmas approaches. Feeling ready for a change in her life, Anna decides to assert her independence by testing the route herself, flying the reindeer sleigh for an impromptu journey ("Mrs. Santa Claus").

A sudden storm forces her to make an emergency landing near the Statue of Liberty. She befriends the stable lad Marcello, who determines Cupid's injury will require a week of rest and recovery. Marcello offers to take "Mrs. North" to the best boarding house in the city; along the way he indicates the marvelous melting pot nature of his neighborhood, and Mrs. North enjoys the sights and sounds of a burgeoning and bustling New York City ("Avenue A"). 

At the boarding house, host Mrs. Lowenstein worries that her daughter Sadie is attracting police attention for her outspoken opinions regarding women's suffrage. After Mrs. North earns the trust of young boarder Nora Kilkenny, the child helps her get a job with a toy manufacturer. Alas, the proprietor is motivated by greed and reminds his child laborers that their work need only last until Christmas ("A Tavish Toy"). As the new Tavish Toy Company supervisor, Mrs. North dispels any worries that she is too old to be working with the children ("Almost Young"). After her concerns about toy quality are ignored, Mrs. North vows to reform conditions at Tavish.

Santa begins to worry about his wife after Arvo reveals that she's been gone for two days. Meanwhile in New York, Mrs. North helps Sadie gather a crowd to demand votes for women ("Suffragette March"). Marcello and Sadie share a mutual attraction despite their incompatibility ("We Don't Go Together at All"). Outside a Vaudeville show, Mrs. North and Nora cement their friendship and vow to help one another ("Whistle"). Back at the North Pole, devoid of his usual cheer, Santa expresses how deeply he misses his lifelong missus ("Dear Mrs. Santa Claus").

At the Tavish factory, Mrs. North has organized a work slowdown, and she is promptly fired. Nora leaves in solidarity ("Whistle" reprise). Clandestinely entering the Tavish factory via the chimney, Mrs. North rallies the children to organize a citywide strike and crusade for labor reforms. At the Christmas ball the next evening, Sadie raises a toast to Mrs. North and all the lives she's touched since her arrival. 

After learning the reindeer have recovered, Mrs. Claus realizes she's ready to return to her husband's side ("He Needs Me"). While searching out the stables, Mrs. Claus is ambushed by Mr. Tavish; he had deduced her real identity, and hid the reindeer to prevent Santa from delivering Christmas presents. Mrs. Claus swiftly resolves the situation with the perfect gift for Tavish. 

On Christmas Eve, Santa invites Anna to ride beside him for the first time, using the new route she devised. Aboard the flying reindeer sleigh, Anna and Santa are thrilled to be reunited, and express their shared devotion ("The Best Christmas of All").

Cast
 Angela Lansbury as Mrs. Anna Claus
 Charles Durning as Santa Claus
 Terrence Mann as Augie Tavish, owner of Tavish Toys
 Michael Jeter as Arvo, Santa's Head Elf  
 Debra Wiseman as Sadie Lowenstein, a Jewish immigrant girl who fights for women's rights
 Lynsey Bartilson as Nora Kilkenny, an Irish immigrant in New York 
 Rosalind Harris as Mrs. Lowenstein, Sadie's mother, a Jewish immigrant
 Sabrina Bryan as Fritzie
 David Norona as Marcello Damoroco, an Italian immigrant in New York, who is in love with Sadie 
 Bryan Murray as Police Officer Doyle, an Irish immigrant in New York

Production
Mrs. Santa Claus was filmed from August 12 to September 19, 1996, at the following studios:

 Universal Studios, Universal City, California – exterior scenes of New York City at New York Street backlot set (Stage 22);
 Stewart Stages, Valencia, California – interior scenes of Santa Claus' workshop and Santa's office sets;
 Havenhurst Studios, Van Nuys, California – blue screen filming of Mrs. Claus in the red sleigh pulled by a herd of reindeer.

The film's musical score was written by Jerry Herman, the composer of such hit Broadway musicals as Hello, Dolly! and La Cage aux Folles. Directed by Terry Hughes, the costume designer was Bob Mackie with choreography by Rob Marshall. The executive producer, David Shaw, is the stepson of Angela Lansbury. Screenwriter Mark Saltzman based some of the script on family stories of the Lower East Side of Manhattan.

Soundtrack

The original television cast recording of Mrs. Santa Claus was recorded from August 8 to 22, 1996 at O'Henry Sound Studios in Burbank, California. It was released on CD and cassette tape by RCA Victor on November 26, 1996.

Track listing

Reception

Nielsen ratings
The film's original broadcast brought in a 14.7/22 rating share, easily winning its timeslot, and tying with a special Thursday repeat of Men Behaving Badly on NBC, for #3 out of 110 programs airing that week.

Awards and nominations

Home media
Mrs. Santa Claus was released on VHS and Laserdisc on October 21, 1997, and again on VHS September 18, 2001. It was first released on DVD on September 23, 2003, and was out of print until a 2018 reissue by Sonar Entertainment.

See also 
 List of Christmas films
 Santa Claus in film

References

External links
New York Times review, December 6, 1996

1996 television films
1996 films
1990s musical comedy films
1990s fantasy comedy films
Christmas television films
American Christmas films
American musical fantasy films
American musical comedy films
American fantasy comedy films
CBS network films
Emmy Award-winning programs
Santa Claus in film
Santa Claus in television
Sonar Entertainment films
Films directed by Terry Hughes (director)
Films set in New York City
Films set in the 1910s
Films set in 1910
Films shot in Los Angeles
1990s Christmas films
American Christmas comedy films
1990s English-language films
1990s American films